German submarine U-62 was a Type IIC, U-boat of Nazi Germany's Kriegsmarine that served in World War II built by Deutsche Werke AG, Kiel and commissioned on 21 December 1939.

U-62 was initially assigned to the 5th U-boat Flotilla during her training period, until 1 January 1940, when she was reassigned to the 1st flotilla for a front-line combat role.

U-62 carried out five war patrols, sinking one warship in May 1940 and one merchant ship in July.

The U-boat was scuttled in Wilhelmshaven on 5 May 1945.

Design
German Type IIC submarines were enlarged versions of the original Type IIs. U-62 had a displacement of  when at the surface and  while submerged. She had two shafts and two  propellers.

U-62 was fitted with three  torpedo tubes at the bow, five torpedoes or up to twelve Type A torpedo mines, and a  anti-aircraft gun. The boat had a complement of 25.

Operational career

First and second patrols
U-62s first patrol began with her departure from the German island of Helgoland (also known as 'Heligoland'), on 13 February 1940. She crossed the North Sea to the Orkney and Shetland Islands. The return journey terminated in Wilhelmshaven on 6 March.

Her second sortie was also through the North Sea but stayed closer to Norway, beginning in Wilhelmshaven and ending in Kiel.

Third patrol
The boat was attacked by an unidentified submarine on 24 May 1940, but U-62 evaded the torpedoes. The British warship had been employed on Operation Dynamo, the evacuation of the British Expeditionary Force (BEF). As a result, many of the dead included soldiers.

Fourth and fifth patrols
Her fourth foray was through the gap between the Faroe and Shetland Islands as far as Northern Ireland, but finished in Bergen in Norway on 7 July 1940.

U-62s final patrol was marked by the sinking of the Pearlmoor  on 19 July 1940 west of Malin Head, (the most northerly point on the Irish mainland). Disaster almost struck on the return leg to Bergen when she was attacked by the British submarine  on the 29th. She avoided the attack and entered Bergen with just 27 minutes of battery life remaining.

Training and Fate
U-62 was assigned to the 21st U-boat Flotilla as a training boat on 1 October, and was briefly commanded by Waldemar Mehl between 5 and 19 November 1941.

She was scuttled in Wilhelmshaven on 5 May 1945, shortly before the German surrender.

Summary of raiding history

References

Notes

Citations

Bibliography

External links
 

German Type II submarines
U-boats commissioned in 1939
World War II submarines of Germany
1939 ships
Ships built in Kiel
Operation Regenbogen (U-boat)
Maritime incidents in May 1945